Printsevka is a rural locality (a selo) and the administrative center of Printsevskoye Rural Settlement, Valuysky District, Belgorod Oblast, Russia. The population was 1,031 as of 2010. There are 12 streets.

Geography 
Printsevka is located 20 km northwest of Valuyki (the district's administrative centre) by road. Pominovo is the nearest rural locality.

References 

Rural localities in Valuysky District